Sir William Aitken  (1825–1892) was a Scottish pathologist.

Aitken, the eldest son of William Aitken, a medical practitioner of Dundee, was born there on 23 April 1825. Having received his general education at the High School, he was apprenticed to his father, and at the same time attended the practice of the Dundee Royal Infirmary. In 1842, he matriculated at the University of Edinburgh, and in 1848 graduated M.D., obtaining a gold medal for his thesis 'On Inflammatory Effusions into the Substance of the Lungs as modified by Contagious Fevers'.

In October of the same year, he was appointed demonstrator of anatomy at the University of Glasgow, under Allen Thomson, and also pathologist to the royal infirmary, which posts he held up to 1855. In that year he was sent out to the Crimea under Dr Robert S. D. Lyons as assistant pathologist to the commission appointed to investigate the diseases from which the British troops were suffering (Parl. Papers, 1856). In 1860, he was selected for the post of professor of pathology in the newly constituted army medical school at Fort Pitt, Chatham, which was afterwards removed to Netley. This appointment he held until April 1892, when failing health necessitated his retirement, and he died the same year on 25 June.

He had been elected a Fellow of the Royal Society in 1873 and was knighted at the jubilee in 1887. In the following year, he received the honorary degrees of LL.D. from the universities of Edinburgh and Glasgow. He married in 1884 Emily Clara, daughter of Henry Allen, esq., who survived him. His portrait by Symonds is at Netley Hospital.

Works 
His works include a well-known Handbook of the Science and Practice of Medicine, 1857, 7th edit. 1880; 'An Essay on the Growth of the Recruit and Young Soldier,' 2nd edit. 1887; and an unfinished 'Catalogue of the Pathological Museum at Netley Hospital.'

References

 https://collection.sciencemuseumgroup.org.uk/people/cp48097/william-aitken

1825 births
1892 deaths
Medical doctors from Dundee
People educated at the High School of Dundee
Alumni of the University of Edinburgh Medical School
Alumni of the University of Glasgow
Scottish knights
Scottish pathologists
Fellows of the Royal Society
Scottish medical writers
19th-century Scottish medical doctors